The 2019 Honduran Supercup was a match arranged by the Honduran Liga Nacional and the Honduran Cup which took place on 24 April 2019 between Platense F.C., winners of the 2018 Honduran Cup and C.D. Marathón the winners (with best record) of the 2017–18 Liga Nacional.  This was the second official edition of the Honduran Supercup and the 6th overall.

F.C. Motagua were the defending champions.

Qualified teams

Background
The game was announced on 13 April 2018.  C.D. Marathón qualified as winners (with best record) of the 2017–18 Honduran Liga Nacional.  Meanwhile, Platense F.C. entered as winners of the 2018 Honduran Cup.  Marathón was seeking for revenge as they had lost the previous edition.  Meanwhile, Platense qualified to their first Supercup since 1999.  They were both looking for their first title.  The match was rescheduled from January to April.

Match

See also
 2017–18 Honduran Liga Nacional
 2018 Honduran Cup

References

Honduran Supercup
Supercup